Ernesto Arturo Sinclair Chávez (born March 10, 1989) is a Panamanian footballer currently playing for Costa del Este FC.

Club career
Sinclair moved to Chile with his parents when only 11 years, then played with Argentinian side Estudiantes and in summer 2008 he returned to Chile, where he had played in the Colo-Colo and Magallanes youth teams, to play on loan for Palestino.

He only returned to Panama to join Sporting San Miguelito from English lower league outfit Arlesey Town, then Alianza and later moved to Independiente.

International
He made his debut for Panama on 27 January 2019 in a friendly against the United States, as a starter.

Honours

Player
Palestino
 Primera División de Chile (1): Runner-up 2008 Clausura

References

External links
 
 
 

1989 births
Living people
Sportspeople from Panama City
Association football midfielders
Panamanian footballers
Panama international footballers
Estudiantes de La Plata footballers
Club Deportivo Palestino footballers
Arlesey Town F.C. players
Sporting San Miguelito players
Alianza Panama players
C.D. Plaza Amador players
A.C.C.D. Mineros de Guayana players
Costa del Este F.C. players
Panamanian expatriate footballers
Expatriate footballers in Chile
Expatriate footballers in Argentina
Expatriate footballers in England
Expatriate footballers in Venezuela
Panamanian expatriate sportspeople in Chile
Panamanian expatriate sportspeople in Argentina
Liga Panameña de Fútbol players